"Right Before My Eyes" is a 1988 song by Patti Day. It was remixed in New York by Bruce Forest and became a major club hit in the US and UK.

Track listing

UK/US vinyl (Bruce Forest mixes)
A1. "Right Before My Eyes" (House Vocal) - 4:57
B1. "Right Before My Eyes" (Extended Club Mix) - 6:11
B2. "Right Before My Eyes" (House Groove) - 5:28

N'n'G version

In 1998, UK garage duo N'n'G (Grant Nelson and Norris Windross) released a garage cover of "Right Before My Eyes" featuring singer Kallaghan on vocals. This version peaked at No. 80 on the UK Singles Chart.
A remix of the song was released in 2000 and featured MC Neat, one half of the duo DJ Luck & MC Neat. This version was a hit, peaking at No. 12 on the UK Singles Chart and No. 1 on the UK Dance Singles Chart.

Track listing
UK CD single (N'n'G feat. Kallaghan, 1998)
 "Right Before My Eyes" (Radio Edit) - 3:53
 "Right Before My Eyes" (Grant Nelson's Buckin' Fumpin' Vocal) - 5:54
 "Right Before My Eyes" (Club Mix) - 5:46

UK CD maxi-single (N'n'G feat. Kallaghan & MC Neat, 2000)
 "Right Before My Eyes" ('The Remix' Edit) - 3:07
 "Right Before My Eyes" (Club Mix Edit) - 3:38
 "Right Before My Eyes" (Grant's Buckin' Fumpin' Remix) - 5:53
 "Right Before My Eyes" ('The Remix') - 6:13

Other versions
In 1990, American singer Lonnie Gordon released her version as the B-side to "Happenin' All Over Again". It was later added as a bonus track on the 1991 CD release If I Have to Stand Alone. It was produced by the remixer of the Patti Day version, Bruce Forest.

In 2014, another version was released by UK singer Little Nikki.

References

1988 songs
1988 singles
1998 singles
2000 singles
2014 singles
Little Nikki songs
House music songs
UK garage songs
Songs written by Michael Zager